The  Miss Connecticut Teen USA competition is the pageant that selects the representative for the state of Connecticut in the Miss Teen USA pageant.

The state pageant directors are:
Crown Productions from 2003 to 2008
Sanders & Associates, Inc., dba- Pageant Associates based in Buckhannon, West Virginia from 2009 to 2017
Five Crown Pageant Productions based in Washington, D.C. from 2018 to 2019
Ewald Productions from 2020

Connecticut has been one of the least successful states at Miss Teen USA. In 2002, Ashley Bickford's placement followed the 4th runner-up placement of Miss Connecticut USA Alita Dawson, who had previously been Miss Connecticut Teen-USA 1997. This was Connecticut's highest joint placement, and the highest joint placement of any state that year. Dawson was one of four Miss Connecticut Teen-USA titleholder to later win the Miss Connecticut-USA title.

The state has produced two Miss Teen USA winners: Logan West who was crowned Miss Teen USA 2012, and Kaliegh Garris who was crowned Miss Teen USA 2019.

Mya Xeller of New Haven was crowned Miss Connecticut Teen USA 2022 on April 10, 2022, at Marriott Airport Hotel in Windsor. She will represent Connecticut for the title of Miss Teen USA 2022.

Results summary

Placements
Miss Teen USAs: Logan West (2012), Kaliegh Garris (2019)
Top 10: Ashley Bickford (2002)
Top 12: Cynthia Schneck (1993)
Top 16: Samantha Sarelli (2020)
Connecticut holds a record of 5 placements at Miss Teen USA.

Awards
Miss Congeniality: Allison Barbeau-Diorio (1987)

Winners 

Color key

1 Age at the time of the Miss Teen USA pageant

References

External links
Official website

Connecticut
Women in Connecticut